Tetraopini is a tribe of longhorn beetles in the subfamily Lamiinae.

Taxonomy
 Mecasoma
 Phaea
 Tetraopes

References

 
Lamiinae